Dicropaltum is a genus of robber flies in the family Asilidae. There are about six described species in Dicropaltum.

Species
These six species belong to the genus Dicropaltum:
 Dicropaltum alamosae Martin, 1975 c g
 Dicropaltum cumbipilosus (Adisoemarto, 1967) i c g
 Dicropaltum humilis (Bellardi, 1861) i c g
 Dicropaltum mesae (Tucker, 1907) i c g
 Dicropaltum pawneeae Martin, 1975 c g
 Dicropaltum rubicundus (Hine, 1909) i c g b
Data sources: i = ITIS, c = Catalogue of Life, g = GBIF, b = Bugguide.net

References

Further reading

 
 
 

Asilinae
Asilidae genera
Articles created by Qbugbot